VideoOverIP is a remote desktop protocol developed by Texas-based, desktop virtualization and cloud computing company VDIworks.

VideoOverIP is similar in many ways to traditional remoting protocols, such as RDP or VNC, but provides a number of additional features that benefit users in Desktop Virtualization or VDI environments. VideoOverIP is currently supported on Microsoft Windows XP, Vista, and 7 hosts, with full support for Microsoft Windows Embedded clients and Apple iPad devices, as well as beta support for Linux systems.

The protocol has been developed in C++ and incorporates a number of features for the efficient transport of remote desktop data across the network. For example, the protocol employs change detection which allows it to isolate changes on screen at the sender, thus reducing the amount of pixel data that has to be transported. Similarly, numerous techniques are employed to automatically sense the type of application running on the sender side so that the appropriate codecs and compression levels can be employed.

VideoOverIP supports two modes of operation which determine how it captures video information from the source:

1. Mirror Driver Mode

Using this methodology, VideoOverIP relies on a mirror driver that is included with the host installer. The mirror driver is used to intercept rendering calls and capture screen changes via an event-based model.
These changes are then processed by the VideoOverIP change detection, optimization, and compression pipelines before being sent to the receiver or client. This technique is typically more efficient in the sense that it utilizes minimum CPU on the host or sender side.

2. GDI Mode

Using this methodology, VideoOverIP uses GDI methods to capture the frame buffer and does not rely on an event-based approach to be notified of on-screen changes. This technique has the advantage of capturing the final, processed image from the frame buffer which allows the protocol to support Microsoft Aero or other sophisticated display technologies which require a host-side GPU. The slight drawback with this approach is the increase in host-side CPU utilization due to the extra polling employed for source-side video capture.

Connection Broker Support 

VideoOverIP does not require a connection broker to operate, but it is fully supported by VDIworks' VDP connection broker and virtual desktop management software.

Major Features 

VideoOverIP provides the following major features:
 Support for multiple monitors
 Support for all major Hypervisors, including VMware ESX and ESXi, Microsoft Hyper-V, Xen and others
 Support for physical systems employing no virtualization
 Support for Apple iPad devices as clients
 Bi-directional audio redirection
 USB redirection

References

External links 
 VDIworks
 VideoOverIP
 Original Press Release for VideoOverIP release at PRWeb
 Announcement regarding VideoOverIP's optimizations for Microsoft Hyper-V
 Fast Remote Desktop VideoOverIP client for iPad

Centralized computing
Remote desktop
Thin clients